The 2011 season was the 33rd season in Kuala Lumpur's existence, and their second consecutive year in the top flight of Malaysian football.

Kuala Lumpur qualified for the Malaysia Cup, after finishing 12th in the Super League and missed out on reaching the quarter-finals by a point after a 2-1 defeat to Selangor in the final group game. They also reached the quarter-finals of the FA Cup for the first time since 2005.

Results and fixtures

Super League

League table

Matches

FA Cup

Malaysia Cup

Friendly matches

Malaysia Cup Group D

Squad statistics

<small>Only lists players who made an appearance or were on the bench.

Transfers
Below are the transfers involving Kuala Lumpur.

In

Out

References

Kuala Lumpur
2011